

Barrow Meadow is a Site of Special Scientific Interest (SSSI) in north Northumberland, England. The site is a species-rich hay meadow of a sort now rare in Northumberland.

Location and natural features
The surrounding terrain is hilly moorland.

The meadow is judged to be species-rich in comparison with fields managed using contemporary farming methods involving the use of artificial fertilisers and reseeding. Aules Hill Meadows in the south-west and Barrow Burn Meadows in the north of the county are similarly protected hay meadows.

Vegetation
Barrow Meadow is a northern hay meadow characterised by the presence of a rich diversity of grasses, and an abundance of herbs. Grass species found at the site include sweet vernal-grass (Anthoxanthum odoratum), crested dog's-tail (Cynosurus cristatus), red fescue (Festuca rubra) and quaking grass (Briza media). Forbs include pignut (Conopodium majus), eyebright (Euphrasia agg.), meadow  vetchling (Lathyrus pratensis), common knapweed (Centaurea nigra) and several species of lady's mantle (Alchemilla glabra), (A. xanthochlora) and (A. filicaulis).

Other species found at the site include wood crane's-bill (Geranium sylvaticum), meadowsweet (Filipendula ulmaria), changing forget-me-not (Myosotis discolor), fairy flax (Linum catharticum), field wood-rush (Luzula campestris), betony (Stachys officinalis) and northern marsh-orchid (Dactylorhiza purpurella), as well as legumes, including meadow vetchling, bitter vetch (Lathyrus montanus), lesser trefoil (Trifolium dubium), red clover (T. pratense), white clover (T. repens), common and greater bird's-foot trefoils (Lotus corniculatus) and (L. uliginosus).

The condition of Barrow Meadow was judged to be favourable in 2012.

See also
List of Sites of Special Scientific Interest in Northumberland

References

External links
Natural England SSSI record for Barrow Meadow

Meadows in Northumberland
Sites of Special Scientific Interest in Northumberland
Sites of Special Scientific Interest notified in 1989
Alwinton